Kauf dir einen bunten Luftballon is a 1961 West German / Austrian film directed by Géza von Cziffra.

Plot summary

Cast 
Ina Bauer as Inge König
Toni Sailer as Hans Haller
Heinz Erhardt as Knapp, Theaterdirektor
Ruth Stephan as Mia
Walter Gross as Josef
Gunther Philipp as Miffke
Ernst Stankovski as Peter Bertram
Paul Hörbiger as Professor Engelbert
Ralf Wolter as Luggi
Katharina Mayberg as Ilona Berg
Fritz Muliar as Franzel
C.W. Fernbach as Hühnchen
Peter Parak as Robert
Ernst Waldbrunn as Gerichtsvollzieher
Oskar Sima as Hermann König
Vienna Ice Revue

Soundtrack

External links 

1961 films
1961 musical comedy films
German musical comedy films
Austrian musical comedy films
West German films
1960s German-language films
Figure skating films
Remakes of German films
Films directed by Géza von Cziffra
1960s German films